Severomorsk-3 is a rural locality (an inhabited locality) in administrative jurisdiction of the closed administrative-territorial formation of Severomorsk in Murmansk Oblast, Russia, located on the Srednyaya River,  southeast of Severomorsk proper. As of the 2010 Census, its population was 2,608.

Severomorsk-3 Air Base and ZEVS are located next to the settlement.

History
It was founded as a work settlement around 1951.

References

Notes

Sources
Official website of Murmansk Oblast. Registry of the Administrative-Territorial Structure of Murmansk Oblast 

Rural localities in Murmansk Oblast
